Richard Lawrence Buzin (January 25, 1946 – September 5, 2020) was an American football offensive tackle who played five seasons in the National Football League with the New York Giants, Los Angeles Rams and Chicago Bears. He was drafted by the New York Giants in the second round of the 1968 NFL Draft. He played college football at Pennsylvania State University and attended Woodrow Wilson High School in Youngstown, Ohio. Buzin was also a member of the Florida Blazers of the World Football League.

He died on September 5, 2020, in Youngstown, Ohio at age 74.

References

External links
Just Sports Stats

1946 births
2020 deaths
Players of American football from Youngstown, Ohio
American football offensive tackles
Penn State Nittany Lions football players
New York Giants players
Los Angeles Rams players
Chicago Bears players
Florida Blazers players